Forbes Creek may refer to one of the following:

Forbes Creek (California)
Forbes Creek (Washington)